Manuela Bocchini (born 26 July 1980) is an Italian rhythmic gymnast. She competed in the women's group all-around event at the 1996 Summer Olympics.

References

External links
 

1980 births
Living people
Italian rhythmic gymnasts
Olympic gymnasts of Italy
Gymnasts at the 1996 Summer Olympics
People from Fano
Sportspeople from the Province of Pesaro and Urbino
20th-century Italian women